Zinc finger protein 831 is a protein that in humans is encoded by the ZNF831 gene.

References

Further reading 

Genes
Human proteins